KUD Mladost Nova Pazova (Artistic Society Mladost Nova Pazova) is a Serbian cultural organisation established in 1953. Successfully operate in the gathering of young, developing tendency for the dance, song, music, plays, poetry, artistic creation, and above all the affirmation of cultural values of the Serbian people and other people who live in the territory of the Republic of Serbia. KUD Mladost NP is a member of the CIOFF Serbia Association since 2003.

Sections

 Small art workshop
 Drama club
 Folklore Section
 Women's singing group
 Folk dance Orchestra

Travel

National Folklore Ensemble and Orchestra traveled to:
 Poland
 Ukraine
 Slovakia
 Hungary
 Romania
 Bulgaria
 Macedonia
 Bosnia and Herzegovina (Serbian Republic)
 Slovenia
 Italy, Sicily
 Brazil

 Women's singing group traveled to:
 Slovakia
 Hungary
 Romania
 Bulgaria
 Bosnia and Herzegovina (Serbian Republic)

 Small art workshop traveled to Bitola (Macedonia).

The program of folk dance ensembles
 Performing folk dance ensemble:

References
 Page KUD Mladost Nova Pazova on Facebook ((sr))
 Page KUD Mladost Nova Pazova on YouTube (Video)
 Page KUD Mladost Nova Pazova on Dailymotion  (Video)
 CIOFF (international folklore organizations in UNESCO)

Resources

Artistic Society Mladost Nova Pazova ((sr))

Serbian cultural organizations
Clubs and societies in Serbia
1953 establishments in Serbia
Stara Pazova
Culture of Vojvodina